Cook Middle School may refer to:
 Cook Middle School - Cypress-Fairbanks Independent School District - Harris County, Texas
 Cook Middle School - Cook County School District - Cook County, Georgia